The Aldine Bible (full title: Πάντα τὰ κατ᾿ ἐξοχὴν καλούμενα βιβλία, θείας δηλαδὴ γραφῆς παλαιᾶς τε καὶ νέας. Sacrae scripturae veteris novaeque omnia.) is an edition of the Bible in Greek (the Septuagint is used for the Old Testament) begun by Aldus Manutius, and published in Venice in 1518 by the Aldine Press. It is the first complete Bible printed entirely in Greek (the Old Testament is the Septuagint) to be published.

History 
Manutius dreamed of a trilingual Bible but never saw it come to fruition. However, before his death Manutius had begun an edition of the Septuagint, also known as the Greek Old Testament translated from Hebrew, the first ever to be published; it appeared posthumously in 1518. This edition is the first complete Bible printed entirely in Greek (first edition of the whole Bible in Greek; the text contained in the Complutensian Polyglot, though dated 1514-17, was not published before 1520).

I. edited by Andreas Asolanus, pt. III., the New Testament, by Franciscus Asolanus).

Characteristics 
The text of this edition is based on the Complutensian text for the Old Testament, and upon the first edition of the New Testament by Erasmus for the New Testament.

The full title of the Aldine Bible is: Πάντα τὰ κατ᾿ ἐξοχὴν καλούμενα βιβλία, θείας δηλαδὴ γραφῆς παλαιᾶς τε καὶ νέας. Sacrae scripturae veteris novaeque omnia. Colophon: Venetiis in aedib[us] Aldi et Andreae soceri. mdxviii., mense Februario.

See also 

 Roman Septuagint

References

Sources 

 
 

Editions of the Septuagint
1518 books